Cocoa West is a census-designated place (CDP) in Brevard County, Florida, United States.  The population was 5,925 at the 2010 census. It is the closest place to Lake Poinsett and Canaveral Groves.

Cocoa West is part of the Palm Bay–Melbourne–Titusville Metropolitan Statistical Area.

Geography

Demographics

As of the census of 2000, there were 5,921 people, 2,237 households, and 1,521 families residing in the CDP. The racial makeup of the CDP was 55.16% White, 40.89% African American, 0.64% Native American, 0.25% Asian, 0.12% Pacific Islander, 1.25% from other races, and 1.69% from two or more races. Hispanic or Latino of any race were 3.53% of the population.

There were 2,237 households, out of which 32.5% had children under the age of 18 living with them, 37.6% were married couples living together, 23.2% had a female householder with no husband present, and 32.0% were non-families. 25.7% of all households were made up of individuals, and 8.1% had someone living alone who was 65 years of age or older.  The average household size was 2.63 and the average family size was 3.11.

In the CDP, the population was spread out, with 29.3% under the age of 18, 8.4% from 18 to 24, 29.5% from 25 to 44, 22.8% from 45 to 64, and 10.0% who were 65 years of age or older.  The median age was 34 years. For every 100 females, there were 97.5 males.  For every 100 females age 18 and over, there were 93.4 males.

The median income for a household in the CDP was $28,094, and the median income for a family was $32,188. Males had a median income of $29,714 versus $20,423 for females. The per capita income for the CDP was $12,964.  About 21.7% of families and 26.8% of the population were below the poverty line, including 43.9% of those under age 18 and 15.0% of those age 65 or over.

References

External links

Census-designated places in Brevard County, Florida
Census-designated places in Florida